E. poeppigii may refer to:

 Epidendrum poeppigii, a neotropical orchid
 Eupatorium poeppigii, a sunflower shrub
 Euphorbia poeppigii, a flowering plant